Lawrence Fanous (born 27 August 1985) is a Jordanian triathlete. He competed in the men's event at the 2016 Summer Olympics.

References

External links
 
 
 

1985 births
Living people
Jordanian male triathletes
Olympic triathletes of Jordan
Triathletes at the 2016 Summer Olympics
Place of birth missing (living people)
Triathletes at the 2014 Asian Games
Asian Games competitors for Jordan
21st-century Jordanian people